Kamalapur  may refer to:

 Kamalapur, Hanumakonda district, Telangana
 Kamalapura, in Bellary district, Karnataka 
 Kamalapura, Gulbarga, Karnataka
 Kamalapur Railway Station, Dhaka, Bangladesh
 Kamalapur, a town in Comilla District Bangladesh

See also
 Kamalpur (disambiguation)